Vacuolar protein sorting-associated protein 45 is a protein that in humans is encoded by the VPS45 gene.

Function 

Vesicle mediated protein sorting plays an important role in segregation of intracellular molecules into distinct organelles. Genetic studies in yeast have identified more than 40 vacuolar protein sorting (VPS) genes involved in vesicle transport to vacuoles. This gene is a member of the Sec1 domain family, and shows a high degree of sequence similarity to mouse, rat and yeast Vps45. The exact function of this gene is not known, but its high expression in peripheral blood mononuclear cells suggests a role in trafficking proteins, including inflammatory mediators.

References

Further reading